Yapp is an English  surname, derived from an Old English word meaning "crooked, bent; deceitful; shrewd, smart". Notable people with the surname include:

Jake Yapp, British comedian, composer, and writer
John Yapp (born 1983), Welsh international rugby union player
Richard Henry Yapp (1871-1929), Botanist
Stan Yapp (1933-2012), first leader of West Midlands County Council
William Brunsdon Yapp (1909-1990), zoologist
Yapp Hung Fai, footballer

There is also a type of binding known as "yapp"; this is a limp leather binding with the covers overlapping the edges of the book; it is named after a bookseller called Yapp.

See also
Ye (surname), spelled Yap or Yapp in Hakka and Minnan
Yap, an island in the Pacific Ocean in the Federated States of Micronesia
Yappie
Yapp (mobile application)

Footnotes

External links
Yapp! Experience, platform with all events and places around you